Kara have released nine studio albums (four in Korean and five in Japanese), eight compilation albums, seven extended plays, and twenty-eight singles. The group's debut studio album The First Blooming was released on March 29, 2007. They entered the Japanese music scene on August 5, 2010, with the Japanese version of "Mister". They also recorded soundtracks of various Korean and Japanese dramas.

Albums

Studio albums

Compilation albums

Box sets

Extended plays

Reissues

Singles

Promotional singles

Other charted songs

Guest appearances

Soundtracks

Video albums

Photobooks

Music videos

Notes

References

External links
 Korean discography at Bugs.co.kr
 Japanese discography at Universal Music Japan website

discography
Discographies of South Korean artists
K-pop music group discographies